Flaunt is an American fashion and culture magazine based in Hollywood, Los Angeles, with an office in New York.

History
The magazine was founded in 1998 by the current C.E.O. Luis Barajas, and Creative Director Jim Turner, who had previously run Detour magazine as well as Long Nguyen. The Editor in Chief is Matthew Bedard.

Past cover models include David Bowie, Brad Pitt, Salma Hayek, Heath Ledger, Beyoncé,  Britney Spears,  Sza, Nick Jonas, Camilla Cabello, Halsey, J Balvin, Cate Blanchett, Fan Bingbing, and Scarlet Johannsen.

In April 2019, Vice News reported a lawsuit filed by a former Flaunt employee in a Los Angeles Superior Court against the magazine, Barajas, and Bedard for "sexual harassment, sexual battery, failure to stop discrimination, and a litany of workplace violations they say they endured while working there". After countersuing the plaintiff, both lawsuits were later dismissed with prejudice and settled privately in October 2019.

Publication
Flaunt is an independent magazine currently published six times a year (after a decade of being published 10 times a year) with international distribution. Celebrity covers include Beyoncé, Britney Spears, Nick Jonas, Pamela Anderson, Cate Blanchett, Brad Pitt, Kanye West, Selena Gomez, Norman Reedus, Jared Leto, Lewis Hamilton and Sofia Boutella. In addition to a celebrity cover, every issue incorporates an art cover, which is a site-specific piece created for the exterior cover of the magazine. Notable art cover contributors include John Baldessari, Taryn Simon, Dan Graham, Julie Mehretu, Zaha Hadid, Rem Koolhaas, Sue de Beer, and David LaChapelle and Lana Del Rey. Top models Editorials include Baptiste Giabiconi and Marco Castelli

Events
Flaunt has extensive digital properties and produces exclusive events in celebration of issue releases around the year, including events at the Cannes Film Festival, Art Basel Miami Beach, Venice Biennale, New York, London, and Milan Fashion Weeks, and the Coachella Valley Music and Arts Festival.

References

External links

Fashion magazines published in the United States
Bimonthly magazines published in the United States
English-language magazines
Magazines established in 1998
Magazines published in Los Angeles